Husnija Fazlić (3 January 1943 – 6 October 2022) was a Bosnian football player and manager. He was a scout for Werder Bremen.

Club career
Fazlić played for Borac Banja Luka in the Yugoslav First League. He finished his career playing for Germany's 2. Bundesliga team 1. FC Saarbrücken.

Managerial career
Fazlić managed Borac Banja Luka in the Yugoslav First League and led the team to their first Yugoslav trophy winning the Yugoslav Cup in 1988. During his time as manager Borac enjoyed the best period in its long history.

Scouting career at Werder Bremen
Fazlić joined Bundesliga club Werder Bremen as an assistant manager to Felix Magath in early 1999. He remained with the club when Magath left. He went on to become a scout at Werder Bremen where he recommended players such Diego and Naldo. He left the club in 2014.

Personal life and death
Fazlić died on 6 October 2022, at the age of 79.

Honours

Manager
Borac Banja Luka
Yugoslav Cup: 1987–88

References

External links

1943 births
2022 deaths
People from Prijedor
Association football midfielders
Yugoslav footballers
FK Borac Banja Luka players
FK Sarajevo players
1. FC Saarbrücken players
Yugoslav First League players
2. Bundesliga players
Yugoslav football managers
Bosnia and Herzegovina football managers
FK Borac Banja Luka managers
Yugoslav First League managers
Yugoslav expatriate footballers
Yugoslav expatriate sportspeople in West Germany
Expatriate footballers in West Germany
Bosnia and Herzegovina expatriate football managers
Expatriate football managers in Germany
Bosnia and Herzegovina expatriate sportspeople in Germany